Harry Walton may refer to:

People
Harry Walton (writer), in Travelers of Space
Harold Walton (cricketer), New Zealand cricketer

Fiction
Harry Walton's Success, book on List of works by Horatio Alger Jr.
Harry Walton, character in Shuffle Along

See also
Henry Walton (disambiguation)